The California Voter Bill of Rights is an adaptation of the United States Voting Rights Act passed in 1965.

External links
Voter Bill of Rights | California Secretary of State
California Voter Guide Website

Constitutional law
California law